Henry Porteous Alexander (September 13, 1801 – February 22, 1867) was a Bank President, and American politician and a U.S. Representative from New York.

Biography
Born in Little Falls, New York, Alexander was the son of William and Catherine Mary Porteous Alexander  and attended the public schools.

Career
Alexander engaged in mercantile pursuits as well as banking. He served as president of the village of Little Falls in 1834 and 1835. Becoming president of the Herkimer County Bank at Little Falls in 1839, he served in that capacity until his death. He was an unsuccessful candidate for election in 1846 to the Thirtieth Congress.

Elected as a Whig to the Thirty-first Congress, Alexander represented the seventeenth district of New York from March 4, 1849, to March 3, 1851. He was an unsuccessful candidate for reelection in 1850 to the Thirty-second Congress, and resumed his former business pursuits.

Death
Alexander died in Little Falls, New York, on February 22, 1867 (age 65 years, 162 days). He is interred at Church Street Cemetery, Little Falls, New York.

References

External links

1801 births
1867 deaths
People from Little Falls, New York
Whig Party members of the United States House of Representatives from New York (state)